Whitney Ann Kroenke (born September 29, 1977) is an American heiress, film producer, and philanthropist.

Early life
Whitney Ann Kroenke was born on September 29, 1977. Her father is Stan Kroenke and her mother is Ann Walton Kroenke. Through her mother, she is a member of the Walton family. She has a brother, Josh Kroenke. She graduated from Northwestern University, where she received a Bachelor of Science in Speech with a Major in Theatre.

Career
She worked as a choreographer, dancer, and actress for I Sing and the London production of Romeo & Juliet directed by Daniel Kramer. She has also produced several documentaries and the narrative feature The Power of Few.

A philanthropist, she is the co-founder of the Playing for Change Movement, where she serves as executive director.

In 2014, she co-founded Nine Banded Whiskey in Austin, Texas.  Nine Banded Whiskey is a creative blend of fine barrel aged whiskeys made in the classic American tradition.

Filmography

As a producer
The Black Jacket
The Power of Few
ReGeneration
Playing for Change: Peace Through Music

References

1977 births
Living people
Walton family
People from Columbia, Missouri
People from Los Angeles
Businesspeople from Los Angeles
Northwestern University School of Communication alumni
Film producers from California
Philanthropists from California